Harold Frank (1921–1995) was an American abstract expressionist artist, born in Southampton, England.

Life and career
Born in England in 1917, Harold Frank and his family immigrated to the United States via Ellis Island. He was brought up in the tenements of New York and showed a talent for drawing when young. Feeling the angst of the great depression and World War II, his search for answers to the meaning of life lead him to take up abstract expressionism:

After some time in the US Army, he traveled to Paris to study and returned to New York in the 1950s. He attended the New York Art Students League, the National Academy of Design, Pratt Institute, Chouinard Art Institute, and UCLA, where he was a colleague of Richard Diebenkorn, who had a lasting influence on his work. Other artists who affected his creative philosophy included De Kooning, Matisse, Picasso, and Rouault.

He had an extensive one-man and group exhibition record and he was shown internationally in London, Paris, Amsterdam and Aubonne, Switzerland, as well as throughout the United States from the 1960s through to the 1980s. His awards included the Adolph and Clara Obrig Award and the Sudam Silver Medal from the National Academy of Design; the National Watercolor Society's Grumbacher Award; the John Marin Memorial Award in the Watercolor U.S.A. Show and a First Prize from the Laguna Beach Museum of Art.

His subject matter included pure abstracts, landscapes, still lifes and the male and female head and figure. As many artists have done, he explored variations of each subject, experimenting with changes in medium, technique, light and color. His paintings of the female head and form quickly developed into a vehicle for his abstract interpretations. He used very quick brushwork and often labored over several pieces at the same time.

His colors are rooted in the creative freedom of the Fauvists and were applied with a craftsman's confidence and expertise.

He led a reclusive and introspective life, yet when asked, he communicated his creative experience with eloquence:

Harold Frank died in Los Angeles, California, USA, in 1995.

Education
National Academy of Design, New York, 1936
Art Students League, New York, 1937
Pratt Institute, Brooklyn, New York
Chouinard Art Institute, Los Angeles
University of California (Los Angeles)
According to the Social Security Death Index found on Ancestry.com, Harold Frank was born in Poland on April 21, 1917 (not 1921).

Selected solo exhibitions
Savage Gallery, London, England, 1960
Galerij Werking, Amsterdam, Netherlands, 1960
Ardail-Castro Gallery, Paris, France, 1960
Pasadena Art Museum, Pasadena, California, 1962
Ryder Gallery, Los Angeles, California, 1964
Ankrum Gallery, Los Angeles, California, 1964
Gallerie Chantepierre, Aubonne, Switzerland, 1966
Haggenmmaker Gallery, Beverly Hills, California, 1966
Irene Neuman Galleries (with Ernest Halpern), Los Angeles, California, 1968
Emerson Gallery, Encino, California, 1973
Otis Art Institute, Los Angeles, California, 1977
Chester House Gallery, Chester, Vermont, 1977
L'Atelier Gallerie, Carmel, California, 1978
Upstairs Downstairs, Laguna Beach, California, 1979
International Student Center, UCLA, 1984
Robert Zehil Gallery, Beverly Hills, California, 1986
Front Porch/Human Arts Gallery, West Los Angeles, California, 1987
Soho Gallery, Studio City, California, 2002 (first posthumous exhibition)

Selected group exhibitions
Los Angeles County Museum of Art, Los Angeles, California, 1959
National Water Color Society Traveling Exhibition, 1965–1968, 1971–1973
San Diego Museum of Art, San Diego, California, 1966
Municipal Art Gallery (Barnsdall Park), Los Angeles, California, 1969
KCET Television Auction, Los Angeles, California, 1968, 1969
Pasadena Art Museum, Pasadena, California, 1971, 1972
Water Color USA, 1968, 1970, 1971, 1973, 1974, 1980
Virginia Museum of Fine Arts, Richmond, Virginia, 1970, 1975
Springfield Art Museum, Springfield, Missouri, 1977–1979
Butler Institute of American Art, Youngstown, Ohio, 1977–1979
William Grant Still Community Arts Center, "Artists Against Hunger," Los Angeles, California, 1985
Otis Art Institute, Los Angeles, California, 1988
Salander-O'Reilly Galleries, Beverly Hills, California, 1992

Selected awards
John Marin Memorial Award, Watercolor USA, 1968
Honor Award, University of Judaism, School of Fine Arts, Los Angeles, California, 1969
Certificate of Merit, National Academy of Design, New York, 1975
All California Show, Laguna Beach Museum of Art, Laguna Beach, California, 1976
Grumbacher Award, National Watercolor Society, 1976
The Adolph and Clara Obrig Prize, National Academy of Design, New York, 1977, 1978
Miles Blatt Award, National Watercolor Society, 1979
Certificate of Merit, Watercolor USA Honor Society, 1986

Selected reviews
Leverque, Jean-Jacques. "Eloge de l'effervescence," Sens Plasticque, 1961
Carles, Henry Galy. "Les Exhibitions a Paris," Aujourd'hui, 1961
Who's Who in Art, 1971–1972
Johnson, Judy, "Poetic Overflow," Southwest Art, June 1980
Bordeau, Jean-Luc. "A Feminine Ideal", Robert Zehil Gallery, Exhibition Catalogue, 1986
Los Angeles Times, 1965, 1985
Welles, Eleanor. Artscene, Los Angeles, January 1987
Mugnaini, Joseph. Expressive Drawing, A Schematic Approach, 1989

Sources
 Sandie Stern, Harold Frank, Abstract Expressionist, 1921–1995, Millennium Twelve Two, 2001.

References

20th-century births
1995 deaths
University of California, Los Angeles alumni
American artists
British emigrants to the United States
Abstract expressionist artists